Ijumaa Mosque is a mosque in Stone Town, Zanzibar, Tanzania. The mosque was completely renovated in 1994 in the modern arabesque style.

See also
 Islam in Tanzania

References

Mosques in Zanzibar
Mosques completed in 1994
Grand mosques
Swahili architecture